Neotrechus is a genus of beetles in the family Carabidae, containing the following species:

 Neotrechus aivicensis Krinsch, 1929
 Neotrechus dalmatinus L. Miller, 1861
 Neotrechus ganglbaueri Padewieth, 1891
 Neotrechus hilfi Reitter, 1903
 Neotrechus lonae J. Muller, 1914
 Neotrechus lupoglavensis Knirsch, 1927
 Neotrechus malissorum J. Muller, 1914
 Neotrechus muharnicensis Knirsch, 1927
 Neotrechus noesskei Apfelbeck, 1908
 Neotrechus oreophilus Knirsch, 1927
 Neotrechus ottonis Reitter, 1905
 Neotrechus paganettii Ganglbauer, 1896
 Neotrechus parvicollis Winkler, 1926
 Neotrechus setniki Reitter, 1904
 Neotrechus silvaticus Winkler, 1926
 Neotrechus speluncarius Reitter, 1916
 Neotrechus striatipennis J. Muller, 1931
 Neotrechus suturalis Schaufuss, 1864
 Neotrechus terrenus Knirsch, 1929
 Neotrechus weiratheri Winkler, 1926

References

Trechinae